Reichle is a surname. Notable people with the surname include:

Art Reichle (1914–2000), American college baseball coach
David Edward Reichle (born 1938), American ecologist
Dick Reichle (1896–1967), American baseball player
Jan Reichle, Australian cinematographer

See also
Reichle Mesa, mesa in Graham Land, Antarctica
Reichle & De-Massari, Swiss technology company

Surnames from given names